Uzbekistan sent a delegation to compete at the 2008 Summer Paralympics in Beijing, People's Republic of China.

Sports

Powerlifting

Swimming

See also
Uzbekistan at the Paralympics
Uzbekistan at the 2008 Summer Olympics

External links
International Paralympic Committee
Beijing 2008 Paralympic Games Official Site

Nations at the 2008 Summer Paralympics
2008
Summer Paralympics